Sarah Lue Bostick (1868–1948) born Sarah Lue Howard near Glasgow, Kentucky, on May 27, 1868, was key in organizing the first African-American Christian Woman's Board of Missions auxiliary in 1892 and subsequent clubs throughout the south at the turn of the 20th century.

In 1892, she was the first African American woman ordained in the Disciples.

Works

See also
 Sadie McCoy Crank
 Jessie Trout

References

Further reading 
 
 
 
 
 
 
 

1868 births
1948 deaths
American Christian missionaries
American religious leaders
Christian Church (Disciples of Christ) clergy
Christian Church (Disciples of Christ) missionaries